Kil-Kare Raceway is a motorsports complex located in Xenia Township, Greene County, near Xenia and Dayton, Ohio, USA.  It first opened in 1959 and features two separate tracks: Kil-Kare Speedway, a 3/8 mile (0.6 km) asphalt oval for stock car racing and Kil-Kare Dragway, a 1/4 mile dragstrip.  The oval is unconventional in shape, with the cars almost in a continuous slide between turns one and four.

The facility is affiliated with both the NHRA and NASCAR and holds events in the Whelen All-American Series as well as local events including figure 8 races and drift events.  It formerly hosted races in ARCA and USAR Pro Cup Series competition.

The name Kil Kare is believed to be derived from an old resort that once stood on the property currently occupied by the raceway. The Creekside Trail bicycle path, which borders the raceway to the south, was once the Columbus and Xenia Railroad. The railroad carried passenger trains near the turn of the 20th century. The passenger trains stopped at the resort that was named "Kill all your cares". As time progressed, the resort closed, the railroad was dismantled, and the name Kil-Kare, which was formed from the name of the resort, stuck.

The 1/4 mile drag strip at Kil-Kare underwent a major renovation in 2013 which included tearing up the old asphalt surface and replacing it with  concrete for the entire length of the strip. Kil-Kare is one of few in the country that features a concrete racing surface for the entire 1/4 mile length. 

Kil Kare Raceway is operational as of the 2015 season.

External links
 Kil-Kare Raceway website

Buildings and structures in Greene County, Ohio
NHRA Division 3 drag racing venues
Motorsport venues in Ohio
Tourist attractions in Greene County, Ohio